Toledo Esporte Clube, commonly known as Toledo, is a Brazilian professional association football club based in Toledo, Paraná, that competes in the Série D, the fourth tier of Brazilian football, as well as in the Campeonato Paranaense, the top division of the Paraná state football league.

History
The club was founded on 10 February 2004. They won the Campeonato Paranaense Second Level in 2007, when they beat Real Brasil, Auritânia and Francisco Beltrão in the final stage of the competition. Toledo competed in the Série C in 2008, when they were eliminated in the Second Stage.

The club won the 2019 Taça Barcímio Sicupira, its first Campeonato Paranaense title.

Achievements
 Campeonato Paranaense Second Level:
 Winners (1): 2007

Stadium
Toledo Colônia Work play their home games at Estádio Municipal 14 de Dezembro. The stadium has a maximum capacity of 20,280 people.

References

 
Football clubs in Paraná (state)
Association football clubs established in 2004
2004 establishments in Brazil